San Ramon Village is a historical unincorporated community in Alameda County, California. It was located north-northeast of Dublin, at an elevation of 354 feet (108 m). It is now a neighborhood within the city of Dublin.

References

External links

Unincorporated communities in California
Unincorporated communities in Alameda County, California